One Piece Bounty Rush is a free-to-play mobile game based on the One Piece franchise, developed and published by Bandai Namco Entertainment. The game is played in real-time with four player teams in battle mode, in which the team that has the most treasure at the end wins. Every battle takes place within a location from the One Piece series.

Production and gameplay
The mobile game is a collaboration between Bandai Namco Entertainment, One Piece author Eiichiro Oda, anime production studio Toei Animation, and the manga publisher Shueisha.

It was initially released on March 29, 2018 for Android and iOS platforms and was taken offline on April 10, 2018 for long-term maintenance and was later re-released with graphics and gameplay overhaul on January 31, 2019.

One Piece Bounty Rush has a team of four players competing against another team of four players in real-time, with each battlefield being based on a location within the One Piece series. The winner is whichever team has the most coins at the end of a battle. Players can enhance a character's level by collecting in-game items from either the story mode or a battlefield. 

Each team has to place their own flag on treasure to claim it. The three character types within a team are Runner, Attacker, or Defender. The runner grabs points, the attacker fights enemies, and the defender moves enemies out of the way. There are a variety of characters to choose from and each character has their own attacks. The attacks include a basic combo and special skills. When using a basic combo, the player has to attack whatever character is closest. Every point from claiming treasure gives the player a small bonus after the battle. When a basic combo is finished, the enemy is knocked down, but they have the ability to not be harmed while getting back up.

Reception 
The game's pre-launch test had one million players. On June 1, 2020, the game's Facebook page reported 20 million downloads.

Dave Aubrey, of Pocket Gamer, wrote, "I don't hate One Piece: Bounty Rush at all, but after getting a feel for how much effort would be required to level up characters and play with a larger variety, it's not something I want to return to." Dan M. Scarborough said in a Blue Moon Game review, "One Piece Bounty Rush is a shift from gacha style to a real-time PvP action game, which is quite a brave move. However, mere bravado is not enough for a game to succeed, a lesson many developers learned the hard way. This game is just not worthy of the effort you need to invest in order to have some reward."

References

External links
Official site

2018 video games
Action video games
Bounty Rush
Android (operating system) games
IOS games
Video games developed in Japan
Gacha games